Aguililla  is a city in the Mexican state of Michoacán. It is the municipal seat for the surrounding municipality of the same name. The municipality has a population of roughly 15,000.

Starting in late 2019, Aguililla has been the center of a conflict between two of the most notorious drug cartels in the country—Jalisco New Generation Cartel (CJNG) and Cárteles Unidos.

Notable people from Aguililla
 Moisés Muñoz, Mexican former professional footballer (goalkeeper)
 Abigael González Valencia, Mexican drug lord (CJNG) and brother of Elvis González Valencia and Rosalinda González Valencia
 Nemesio Oseguera Cervantes, Mexican drug lord, leader of CJNG and younger brother of Antonio Oseguera Cervantes
 Rosalinda González Valencia, Mexican businesswoman, money launderer, wife of Nemesio Oseguera Cervantes and sister of Abigael González Valencia and Elvis González Valencia
 Antonio Oseguera Cervantes, Mexican drug lord and older brother of Nemesio Oseguera Cervantes
 Elvis González Valencia, Mexican drug lord and brother of Abigael González Valencia and Rosalinda González Valencia

References

External links
 Menlo Park and Aguililla
 Facts about Aguililla and Redwood City
 Photo Exhibit Highlights Immigration, from the Stanford Daily Online

Municipalities of Michoacán